Mary Woodard Lasker (November 30, 1900February 21, 1994) was an American health activist and philanthropist. She worked to raise funds for medical research and founded the Lasker Foundation.

Early life
Mary Woodard was born in Watertown, Wisconsin, the daughter of Sara Johnson Woodard and Frank Elwin Woodard. Lasker attended the University of Wisconsin, Madison and graduated from Radcliffe College with a major in Art History. While Lasker was growing up, her mother, an active civic leader, instilled in Lasker the values of urban beautification. 

Lasker worked as an art dealer at Reinhardt Galleries in New York City. She married the owner Paul Reinhardt. After divorcing, she created a fabric company, Hollywood Patterns.

Health Advocate
In 1938 she became the president of the Birth Control Federation of America, the precursor of the Planned Parenthood Federation.

Her second marriage was to Lord and Thomas advertising executive Albert Lasker until his death in the early 1950s of colon cancer. Ironically, her husband's ad agency had promoted smoking with the slogan, "L.S.M.F.T.—Lucky Strike Means Fine Tobacco"  back when the dangers of smoking were not well known.  Indeed, Albert's special charge at his firm was to get more women to smoke, as they lagged far behind men as smokers.

The Laskers supported the national health insurance proposal under President Harry S. Truman. After its failure, Mary Lasker saw research funding as the best way to promote public health.

With her husband, they created the Lasker Foundation in 1942 to promote medical research. The Lasker Award is considered the most prestigious American award in medical research. As of 2015, eighty-seven Lasker laureates have gone on to receive a Nobel Prize.

Together, they were the first to apply the power of modern advertising and promotion to fighting cancer. They joined the American Society for the Control of Cancer which at the time was sleepy and ineffectual and transformed it into the American Cancer Society. The Laskers ousted the board of directors. Afterwards, they raised then record amounts of money and directed much of it to research. The American Cancer Society also fought lung cancer through prevention via anti-smoking campaigns. Using TV equal-time provisions, they were able to counter cigarette advertising with their own message. 

In 1970, Congress passed a law banning the advertising of cigarettes on television, so the anti-smoking commercials likewise went off the air. 

Following her husband's death, she founded the National Health Education Committee.

She played major roles in promoting and expanding the National Institutes of Health, helping its budget expand by a factor of 2000 times from $2.4 million in 1945 to $5.5 billion in 1985.

Lasker was prominent in lobbying Eleanor Roosevelt to endorse Lyndon Johnson's efforts to become the 1960 Democratic nominee.  Lady Bird Johnson wrote about Lasker numerous times in her book A White House Diary, calling her house "charming ... like a setting for jewels" and thanking her for gifts of daffodil bulbs for parkways along the Potomac River and for thousands of azalea bushes, flowering dogwood and other plants to put along Pennsylvania Avenue.

Lasker was also instrumental in getting the US government to fund the War on Cancer in 1971.

Braniff Airways Board Member 
On September 15, 1971, Mrs. Lasker was elected to the Board of Directors of Braniff Airways, Incorporated. She became only the second female board member of Braniff following Braniff cofounder Thomas Elmer Braniff's wife, Bess Clark Braniff, who was elected to the board after the untimely death of her husband in January 1954. Mary Lasker's appointment to the Braniff board was rare and she joined a very small group of women who were directors at large American corporations.

Awards and recognition 
Mary Lasker is a recipient of the Presidential Medal of Freedom in 1969, the Four Freedoms Award 1987 and the Congressional Gold Medal in 1989.
The Mary Woodard Lasker Award for Public Service was renamed in her honour in 2000.
On May 14, 2009 the United States Postal Service honored Lasker with the issuance of a stamp of face value 78 cents, designed by Mark Summers. The stamp was released, in part, as recognition of a renewed US government commitment to funding of biomedical research. A release ceremony was held in Lasker's hometown on May 15, 2009.

Organizations
Birth Control Federation of America
Planned Parenthood
National Committee for Mental Hygiene
Lasker Foundation
National Health Education Foundation
National Institutes of Health
American Cancer Society
Research to Prevent Blindness
Cancer Research Institute
United Cerebral Palsy Research and Education Foundation
Museum of Modern Art
American Heart Association

See also
 Albert Lasker - Husband
 Cancer (2015 PBS film)
 History of cancer
 Lasker Award - given out by the Foundation
 The Emperor of All Maladies: A Biography of Cancer

References

Sources
The Mary Lasker Papers

External links 

 Notable New Yorkers - Mary Lasker Biography, photographs, and interviews of Mary Lasker from the Notable New Yorkers collection of the Oral History Research Office at Columbia University.
 The Mary Lasker Papers - Profiles in Science, National Library of Medicine

1900 births
1994 deaths
American health activists
American philanthropists
Congressional Gold Medal recipients
People from Watertown, Wisconsin
Presidential Medal of Freedom recipients
Radcliffe College alumni
University of Wisconsin–Madison alumni
People associated with Planned Parenthood
Burials at Sleepy Hollow Cemetery
Lasker Award
Recipients of the Four Freedoms Award